Tony Colman may refer to:
 Tony Colman (politician), Labour Party politician and MP
 Tony Colman (musician), drum and bass producer, co-founder of London Elektricity and Hospital Records
 Sir Anthony Colman (1938–2017), former British High Court judge